James Shepherd (born 24 May 1857, date of death unknown) was an Australian cricketer. He played five first-class matches for New South Wales in 1889/90.

See also
 List of New South Wales representative cricketers

References

External links
 

1857 births
Year of death missing
Australian cricketers
New South Wales cricketers
Cricketers from Melbourne